Tuberopeplus krahmeri is a species of beetle in the family Cerambycidae. It was described by Cerda in 1980. It is known from Chile.

References

Phacellini
Beetles described in 1980
Endemic fauna of Chile